Malå IF is a Swedish football club located in Malå in Västerbotten County.

Background
Since its foundation Malå IF has participated mainly in the middle and lower divisions of the Swedish football league system.  The club currently plays in Division 3 Norra Norrland which is the fifth tier of Swedish football. They play their home matches at the Tjamstavallen in Malå.

Malå IF are affiliated to Västerbottens Fotbollförbund.

Recent history
In recent seasons Malå IF have competed in the following divisions:

2017- 2020 Division V Västerbotten Norra

2010 – Division IV, Västerbotten Norra
2009 – Division IV, Västerbotten Norra
2009 – Division IV, Västerbotten Elit
2008 – Division IV, Västerbotten Norra
2007 – Division III, Norra Norrland
2006 – Division III, Norra Norrland
2005 – Division IV, Västerbotten Norra
2004 – Division IV, Västerbotten Norra
2003 – Division IV, Västerbotten Norra
2002 – Division III, Norra Norrland
2001 – Division IV, Västerbotten Norra
2000 – Division IV, Västerbotten Norra
1999 – Division IV, Västerbotten Norra

Famous Players

Malå IF have had the following talented players:

Footnotes

External links
 Malå IF – Official website

Football clubs in Västerbotten County
Association football clubs established in 1936
1936 establishments in Sweden